The 1899 international cricket season was from April 1899 to September 1899.

Season overview

June

Australia in England

References

International cricket competitions by season
1899 in cricket